Doug Unplugs is an American children's computer-animated television series produced by DreamWorks Animation for Apple TV+. The series is based on the Doug Unplugged children's book series by Dan Yaccarino. The first seven episodes of season one were released on November 13, 2020, with the next six episodes released on April 2, 2021. The second season premiered on September 17, 2021.

Premise 
Doug Unplugs follows a robot, Doug, and his human friend, Emma, as they experience and learn how the world works.

Cast and characters 
 Brandon James Cienfuegos as Doug
 Kyrie McAlpin as Emma Pine
 Eric Bauza as Bob Bot
 Mae Whitman as Becky Bot
 Leslie David Baker as Uncle Forknick
 Burl Moseley as Laurence Pine
 Becky Robinson as Jenny Droneberg

Episodes

Series overview

Season 1 (2020–21)

Season 2 (2021–22)

Release 
On September 17, 2020, Apple announced Doug Unplugs, along with several new children's television series that would be coming to Apple TV+ later in 2020. The first half of season one was released on November 13, 2020, with the second half released on April 2, 2021. The second season premiered on September 17, 2021.

Accolades 
Kyrie McAlpin was nominated for Outstanding Younger Voice Performer in an Animated or Preschool Animated Program at the 1st Children's and Family Emmy Awards.

References

External links 
 

2020 American television series debuts
2020s American children's television series
2020s American animated television series
American children's animated adventure television series
American computer-animated television series
Animated television series about children
Animated television series about robots
Apple TV+ original programming
English-language television shows
Television series by DreamWorks Animation
Apple TV+ children's programming